Lü Yi (born 30 April 1985) is a badminton player from the People's Republic of China. He entered the national second team in 2002, and was promoted to the first team in 2006. He was part of the national junior team that won the gold medal at the 2002 World Junior Championships. In the individual events, he was the champions at the 2007 Austrian International, Bitburger Open, and Russian Open.

Lü graduated with a bachelor of science degree at the Beijing Capital Normal University in 2007, and now works as a teacher in University of International Business and Economics.

Achievements

BWF Grand Prix 
The BWF Grand Prix has two levels, the BWF Grand Prix and Grand Prix Gold. It is a series of badminton tournaments sanctioned by the Badminton World Federation (BWF) since 2007.

Men's singles

  BWF Grand Prix Gold tournament
  BWF Grand Prix tournament

BWF International Challenge/Series 
Men's singles

  BWF International Challenge tournament
  BWF International Series tournament

References

External links 
 BWF Profile

Living people
1985 births
Badminton players from Beijing
Chinese male badminton players
21st-century Chinese people